Bufo Alvarius, also known as Bufo Alvarius, Amen 29:15, is the debut studio album by Bardo Pond, released in 1995 by Drunken Fish Records. It takes its name from the toad whose skin contains the psychoactive substance 5-MeO-DMT.

Reception 
Trouser Press praised the album, with Deborah Sprague writing that it is "every bit as synapse-destroying as its namesake. More consistently aggressive than like-minded drone-dreamers Magic Hour and Spiritualized, Bardo Pond recalls Hawkwind’s headier days in psychedelic sludgestorms like the half-hour-long “Amen 29:15.” The bottom-end heft is countered by Sollenberger’s ethereal vocals — which bear a passing resemblance to that of Renaissance art-rock songbird Annie Haslam — and her playing, which is so striking that it just about absolves the flute for the sins of Ian Anderson." According to Ned Raggett writing for AllMusic: "The slow, stony pace that "Adhesive" establishes for Bufo Alvarius Amen 29:15 continues through the album's remaining tracks, but in such a way that Bardo Pond rapidly become their own band and not merely the sum of their influences. There's something about the combination of lo-fi crunch, post-shoegaze bliss-out, stoner Quaalude head-nodding, and Loop/Spacemen 3-inspired drone that's truly unique."

Legacy 
The album has continued to receive acclaim throughout the years. Of the album's lack of commercial success, Noel Gardner of The Quietus wrote in retrospect: "It's not hard to see why: clearly, they were never going to make mass consumption music, but they sounded like pretty much nothing else out there. In the main, they still don't." "Bufo Alvarius didn't just stand out like the proverbial sore thumb when first released 15 years ago," wrote Dom Gourlay for Drowned in Sound, "but actually sounds wholly unique today, its only close compatriots probably being White Hills' Glitter Glammer Atrocity or Earth's The Bees Made Honey In The Lion's Skull. However, where both the former and the latter proffer power and sound expansion over tenacity, Bardo Pond are one of those outfits where the adjective 'experimental' genuinely means what it says on the tin." Italian magazine OndaRock named it one of their "milestone" albums, with Francesco Alti calling it a "strongly modern work, [...] of a classic, timeless beauty." The magazine's editors would go on to rank it the 34th best psychedelic album of all time (a spot it shares with Rolling Stones' Their Satanic Majesties Request).

Track listing

Personnel
Adapted from the Bufo Alvarius, Amen 29:15 liner notes.

Bardo Pond
 Joe Culver – drums, vocals (1)
 John Gibbons – guitar, vocals (4)
 Michael Gibbons – guitar, vocals (3)
 Isobel Sollenberger – leads vocals, flute
 Clint Takeda – bass guitar (8)

Production and additional personnel
 Bardo Pond – production
 Art Difuria – production, engineering

Release history

References

External links 
 

1995 debut albums
Bardo Pond albums
Drunken Fish Records albums
Fire Records (UK) albums